Beloved is a 1934 American pre-Code drama film directed by Victor Schertzinger and written by Paul Gangelin and George O'Neil. The film stars John Boles, Gloria Stuart, Morgan Farley, Ruth Hall, Albert Conti and Dorothy Peterson. The film was released on January 22, 1934, by Universal Pictures.

Plot
An aristocratic violin prodigy, Carl Hausmann (Boles), escapes revolution in Vienna in 1848 and flees with his mother Irene (Peterson) to Charleston, North Carolina, where he is drawn to the music of the slaves. He meets a young woman, Lucy Tarrant (Stuart), whom he takes on as a piano student. The couple fall in love but Lucy's father, Major Tarrant (Breese) refuses his permission to marry. Carl emerges from the Civil War a hero, and in the meantime both Irene and Major Tarrant have died, and the Tarrants are now destitute,

Carl and Lucy marry and move to New York, where they survive on a meager income from Carl's piano lessons. Meanwhile he dreams of writing a great "American Symphony". Needing more money he falls in with Judge B. T. Belden (Carle), an unscrupulous showman who exploits Carl's violin ability. Lucy convinces him that this is dangerous to his reputation as a serious musician. The couple moves into a boardinghouse run by Mrs. Briggs (La Verne), where Carl works on his compositions while Lucy supports them. Shamed by remarks about letting his wife support him, Carl gets a job playing piano in a saloon. Lucy becomes pregnant and gives birth to a boy, Charles.

Ten years later Carl is working as a piano and violin teacher, but is unable to interest Charles (Woods) in music. In order to earn extra money he reluctantly sells some of his songs to an advertising agent. Meanwhile, Charles gets a young woman, Helen Burroughs (Mercer), pregnant, and is forced by his father to marry her. In an attempt to redeem himself Charles enlists in the Spanish–American War, where he is killed. Helen dies giving birth to a son, Eric. Returning from World War I Eric (Farley) adapts Carl's beloved Negro Spirituals into Jazz, including the song My Beloved. He continues to plagiarize additional music, featured in stage hits sung by Patricia Sedley (Hall), whom Eric later marries.

Carl visits Eric's publisher, Mr. Yates (Clark) who insults him by calling his music a poor imitation of Eric's. Finally, Alexander Talbot (Shaw) of the "Metropolitan Symphony Society", encouraged by a donation from Eric, looks at Carl's American Symphony and, impressed, agrees to perform it. Reconciled, Eric and Carl attend the performance where Lucy's ghost smiles to hear her husband's work finally performed. During the performance Carl dies, happy that he has at last been recognized.

Cast    
   
John Boles as Carl Hausmann
Gloria Stuart as Lucy Tarrant Hausmann
Morgan Farley as Eric Hausmann
Ruth Hall as Patricia Sedley
Albert Conti as Baron Franz von Hausmann
Dorothy Peterson as Baroness Irene von Hausmann
Edmund Breese as Maj. Tarrant
Louise Carter as Mrs. Tarrant
Anderson Lawler as Tom Rountree
Richard Carle as Judge B. T. Belden
Lucile Gleason as The Duchess
Mae Busch as Marie
Jimmy Butler Charles Hausmann, as a boy
Eddie Woods as Charles Hausmann
Oscar Apfel as Henry Burrows
Jane Mercer as Helen
Lester Lee as Carl, age 10
Mickey Rooney as Tommy
Holmes Herbert as Lord Landslake
Lucille La Verne as Mrs. Briggs
Mary Gordon as Mrs. O'Leary
Wallis Clark as Yates
Josef Swickard as Revolutionist
James Flavin as Wilcox
Bessie Barriscale as Mrs. Walkins
Bobbe Arnst as The Dancer
Fred Kelsey as Mulvaney
Otto Hoffman as Dietrich
George Ernest as Eric, as a Boy
Cosmo Kyrle Bellew as Doctor
King Baggot as Second Doctor
Sherwood Bailey as Tom, as a Boy
William H. Strauss as Jewish Father
Neysa Nourse as Laurette
Peggy Terry as Alice
Clara Blandick as Miss Murfee
Margaret Mann as Countess von Brandenburg
C. Montague Shaw as Alexander Talbot
Walter Brennan as Stuttering Boarder

References

External links
 

1934 films
American drama films
1934 drama films
Universal Pictures films
Films directed by Victor Schertzinger
American black-and-white films
Films produced by B. F. Zeidman
1930s English-language films
1930s American films